Admiral of the Fleet Sir Philip Louis Vian,  & Two Bars (15 July 1894 – 27 May 1968) was a Royal Navy officer who served in both World Wars.

Vian specialised in naval gunnery from the end of World War I, and subsequently received several appointments as gunnery officer. In the early 1930s, he was given command of a destroyer, and, later, various destroyer flotillas. During this phase of his career, in early 1940, he commanded a force that forcibly released captured British merchant sailors from the German supply ship Altmark in Jøssingfjord in then-neutral Norway and, later, his flotilla took an active role in the final action of the German battleship Bismarck.

Much of Vian's World War II service was in the Mediterranean, where he commanded a cruiser squadron, defended several critical convoys and led naval support at the Allied invasions of Sicily and Italy. His wartime service was completed in command of the air component of the British Pacific Fleet, with successful actions against the Japanese in Sumatra and the western Pacific. Post-war, Vian served in the United Kingdom, as a Fifth Sea Lord and as Commander-in-Chief, Home Fleet. He retired in 1952 with the rank of Admiral of the Fleet, took up commercial directorships and died at home, in 1968.

Early life
Born the son of Alsager Richard Vian and Ada Frances Vian (née Renault), Vian joined the Royal Navy as an officer cadet in May 1907 and was educated at the Royal Naval Colleges at Osborne and Dartmouth. On passing out from Dartmouth in 1911, Vian and his term sailed for the West Indies on the training cruiser  but the cruise was ended by grounding on an uncharted reef off Nova Scotia. He became a midshipman on the pre-dreadnought battleship , which was serving with the Home Fleet, on 15 January 1912.

World War I
At the start of World War I Vian remained on Lord Nelson which, as an obsolescent ship, was kept at Portland away from danger. This was disappointing for Vian, but when the ship was to be transferred to the Mediterranean he was posted to what he considered to be an even less desirable appointment. He was confirmed as a sub-lieutenant in January 1915. Whilst on this ship, he was a spectator at the Battle of Jutland, in which his ship played no active part.

Inter-war
Following gunnery courses in 1916, 1918 and 1919 at the Royal Naval gunnery school, Vian obtained a First Class certificate in Gunnery in October 1919. On his return to the Royal Navy, Vian was given a series of appointments as gunnery officer, first, in January 1923, to the battleship , then serving as a cadet training ship. During this appointment, he was promoted to lieutenant-commander on 15 February 1924. This was followed in 1924 by two appointments to aging s ( and ). There was a short period at the Devonport gunnery school and another sea posting, to the battleship  in the Mediterranean Fleet in May 1925.

There followed two foreign postings, still as a gunnery specialist. For the two years up to January 1933, Vian had a "shore" appointment at the Admiralty in London, with the Director for Staff Training and Development (DTSD), analysing practice gunnery statistics. He then attended a short Tactical Course in Portsmouth and subsequently took command (his first), in March 1933, of the destroyer  and a Division within the 3rd Destroyer Flotilla (part of the Mediterranean Fleet).

A biography of the playwright Noël Coward refers to Coward meeting Vian at that time. Vian's first words to Coward were "What the hell are you doing on board this ship?" However, after speaking to Coward and having gin with him in the captain's cabin, Vian permitted Coward to stay on the ship for a cruise on the ship ending on the Pacific side of the Panama Canal, Coward finally ending up in Trinidad some time later.

However, Vian's commander-in chief, William Fisher, had remained well-disposed towards him, and these incidents had no ill effect on his career: he was promoted to captain on 31 December 1934. On his return to the UK in early 1935, he was told to expect to spend time on half-pay, but the Abyssinian crisis intervened and he was given command of the 19th Destroyer Flotilla (on board ), which had been activated from the reserve to reinforce Malta.

Vian returned to the UK in July 1935 at the end of the crisis and attended a Senior Officers Technical Course before rejoining the 19th Destroyer Flotilla. In May 1936, he was transferred to command the 1st Destroyer Flotilla, flotilla leader , also at Malta. In July, 1st Destroyer Flotilla returned to Portsmouth. En route home, however, Vian's ships responded to a call from the British Consul in Vigo for protection for British residents at the start of the Spanish Civil War. His ships acted in various roles, including, after discussion, the evacuation of British residents. When relieved by the 2nd Destroyer Flotilla, Vian's ships continued home. He greatly preferred sea duties and gladly took up the new appointment in March 1937.

World War II
Vian returned to the UK shortly before World War II broke out. An appointment to command the boys' training establishment  was cancelled, and he was appointed to command of the 11th Destroyer Flotilla. This flotilla had been recently activated from reserve and consisting of seven old s plus his own ship, based first at Plymouth then at Liverpool, with the role of escorting Atlantic convoys. There was an ineffective brush with a U-boat. A change in policy required Vian, as a Captain (D), to operate from shore, the better to command his flotilla. Early in 1940 he moved, this time to command of the 4th Destroyer Flotilla, the famous s.

Altmark

In February 1940, Vian's flotilla was ordered to find and locate the German supply tanker, . When found, Altmark was in neutral Norwegian waters, escorted by two Norwegian torpedo boats. After peacefully negating the Norwegian opposition, Vian pursued Altmark into Jøssingfjord, she was boarded and the captives were freed. The German and Norwegian governments protested that this was a violation of international law and of Norwegian neutrality. However, occurring during a quiet stage in the war, the incident was widely publicised in Britain. Vian was awarded the Distinguished Service Order (DSO) for this successful action, the citation was published in a supplement to the London Gazette of 9 April 1940 (dated 12 April 1940, and read:

Naval actions
The Germans invaded Norway on 9 April 1940 and Vian, now in Afridi, was engaged in a number of operations against German shipping and warships and in support of Allied troops. On 9 April 1940, Vian's destroyers were escorting two cruisers ( and ) off Bergen when they came under heavy German air attack.  became isolated and was sunk. From 15 to 17 April, Afridi assisted and protected British troop landings at Namsos (Operation Maurice), which were a part of a planned pincer movement to seize Trondheim. Vian was Mentioned in Despatches for his part in the action.

On the night of 13/14 October, Vian, now re-established in HMS Cossack and with HMS Ashanti, Maori and Sikh, attacked a small German convoy off Egerö light. Although the operation's success was over-stated (just one ship was sunk and later refloated), Vian was awarded a bar to his DSO.

On 22 May 1941, Vian, in HMS Cossack, with several destroyers, provided additional escort to troop convoy WS8B en route from Glasgow to the Indian Ocean. On 25 May, Vian's destroyers (HMS Cossack, Maori, Sikh, Zulu and ) were detached from the convoy to join the search for the German battleship . Eventually, Vian's flotilla participated in the destruction of Bismarck. While the main battle fleet awaited daylight, they, in a series of night attacks, harried the German ship. They failed to score a hit in the darkness, but their activities fixed the German's position and denied the crew much-needed rest before the main battle on 27 May. Afterwards, they escorted  back to Scotland. Vian received a second bar to his DSO for this action.

Vian was promoted to rear admiral on 8 July 1941, by special order of the First Sea Lord, Sir Dudley Pound. During July and August, 1941, Vian was involved in liaising with the Soviet Navy to assess their readiness and to investigate the practicalities of a British naval force being based at Murmansk or nearby. In the event, Vian advised against this, but in September, 1941, he commanded Force K, a naval force that supported an Anglo-Canadian raid and demolition on the Norwegian archipelago of Spitsbergen. The intention was to clear out any German garrison (there was none), destroy the coal mines and coal stocks and evacuate the Russian miners. The operation was successful and during Force K's return, a German convoy was intercepted and the German training cruiser  was sunk.

Mediterranean
The main naval tasks at this stage of the Mediterranean campaign were to ensure the survival of Malta as a British possession and military base by the protection of supply convoys while preventing Italian convoys supplying their forces in north Africa. Secondary tasks included the supply and artillery support of Allied military actions in north Africa and elsewhere, such as a successful bombardment of Derna in December. Vian's first convoy was in December 1941 and led to the First Battle of Sirte. This was, in effect, a series of skirmishes between British and Italian warships escorting desperately needed supply convoys. Overall, the fight was inconclusive, but both sides managed to deliver the supplies. There were several sorties to support the army and to intercept Italian convoys.

Malta was still in a desperate state and another convoy (MG1) was run in March 1942. This time, the Italian Navy made a more determined attempt to intercept the convoy, leading to the Second Battle of Sirte. Vian's force of cruisers and destroyers, using threat and concealment by smoke, managed to hold off the Italians while the convoy escaped. The naval action was portrayed as a tactical success against a greatly superior enemy, although the convoy's progress was sufficiently delayed to leave it vulnerable to air attacks and all four transports were sunk and the bulk of the supplies were lost. Despite this, Vian received a personal letter of congratulation from Winston Churchill and he was appointed a Knight Commander of the Most Excellent Order of the British Empire (KBE).

In June 1942, Vian's force provided escort for the Operation Vigorous convoy from Haifa and Port Said. This was a part of a sequence of movements but it was rebuffed by strong surface and air forces and returned. After this failed operation, Vian's health deteriorated and he was sent back to Britain in September 1942. During a delay in the journey in west Africa, he caught malaria and was not passed fit for service until January, 1943. In January, he was Mentioned in Despatches for "outstanding zeal, patience and cheerfulness and for setting an example of wholehearted devotion to duty without which the high tradition of the Royal Navy could not have been upheld".

Vian's physical condition was now considered to debar him from further sea service and in April 1943 he was appointed to the planning staff for the invasion of Europe. Probably much to his relief, however, this shore job was pre-empted by his return to the Mediterranean to command (from ) an amphibious force for the Allied invasion of Sicily in July 1943.

In September 1943, he commanded Force V, a flotilla of escort aircraft carriers providing air support for the Allied landings at Salerno, Italy. The planned period had to be increased and, when Lieutenant General Mark Clark, commanding the American Fifth Army, requested Force V to stay longer despite fuel shortages, Vian replied: "My carriers will stay here if we have to row back." Vian was twice Mentioned in Despatches; once for each of the Italian operations.

Normandy landings
In November 1943, Vian returned to the UK as commander of Force J in preparation for D-Day and in January 1944, he was appointed commander of the Eastern Task Force (in ), supporting the D-Day landings in Normandy. He was appointed Companion of the Order of the Bath (CB) in the King's Birthday Honours, which coincided with the early stages of the invasion. After the success of the landings, he was appointed Knight Commander of the Order of the Bath (KCB) "for distinguished services in the planning and execution of the successful landings".

British Pacific Fleet

In November 1944, Vian became the commander in charge of air operations of the British Pacific Fleet (Flag Officer Commanding, 1st Aircraft Carrier Squadron, British Pacific Fleet and Second in Command, British Pacific Fleet, in ). The first operations of Vian's new command were against Japanese oil and port installations in Sumatra (Operations Cockpit, Transom, Lentil and Meridian). These served to damage the enemy's capabilities, distract his attention from events elsewhere and provide experience for the British and Commonwealth crews in the procedures that they would use while working with the Americans in the western Pacific. The U.S. aircraft carrier, participated in the training exercises and the first two operations. Vian was Mentioned in Despatches once again for "bravery, skill and devotion to duty". Once in the Pacific, the BPF operated as Task Force 57 from March 1945, providing air support for the American invasion of Okinawa (Operation Iceberg). Their role was to interdict the Sakishima Islands, suppressing Japanese air operations. Vian's carriers were externally resistant to the determined suicide attacks, returning to active service within hours. He was promoted to vice admiral on 8 May 1945.

Post war
After the Japanese surrender, Vian returned finally to the UK and became Fifth Sea Lord in charge of naval aviation from 1946 until 1948, when he was promoted to admiral. His final appointment was Commander in Chief, Home Fleet (in ) until his retirement in 1952. He was promoted to Knight Grand Cross of the Order of the Bath (GCB) in the 1952 New Year Honours. On 1 June 1952 he was promoted to Admiral of the Fleet, a rare but not unprecedented recognition for an officer who had not reached the pinnacle of the Royal Navy as First Sea Lord.

Vian was Mentioned in Despatches five times, and received several foreign awards.

In retirement, Vian became a director of the Midland Bank and the North British and Mercantile Insurance Company. He also published his memoirs, Action This Day, in 1960. He died on 27 May 1968 at his home at Ashford Hill, Hampshire near Newbury, Berkshire.

Family
Vian married, on 2 December 1929, Marjorie, daughter of Colonel David Price Haig, OBE of Withyham in Sussex; they had two daughters.

Honours

Vian's honours were as follows:

See also

 Legion of Honour
 List of Legion of Honour recipients by name (V)
 List of foreign recipients of the Legion of Honour by country
 List of British recipients of the Legion of Honour for the Crimean War
 Legion of Honour Museum

References

Sources

Further reading
 
 Vian's full service record is part of the document piece ADM 196/56 at The National Archives.  A full PDF is available (fee may be required) Documents Online—Image Details—Vian, Philip Louis

External links

Royal Navy Officers 1939−1945

|-

1894 births
1968 deaths
Commanders of the Legion of Merit
Companions of the Distinguished Service Order
Foreign recipients of the Distinguished Service Medal (United States)
Graduates of Britannia Royal Naval College
Knights Commander of the Order of the British Empire
Knights Grand Cross of the Order of the Bath
Recipients of the Legion of Honour
Lords of the Admiralty
Order of the Dannebrog
Military personnel from London
Recipients of the Croix de Guerre 1939–1945 (France)
Recipients of the St. Olav's Medal with Oak Branch
Royal Navy admirals of the fleet
Royal Navy admirals of World War II
Royal Navy officers of World War I
Graduates of the Royal Naval College, Greenwich
People educated at the Royal Naval College, Osborne
Recipients of the Navy Distinguished Service Medal